3 is the third studio album by underground hip-hop group Typical Cats. It was released on September 25, 2012, on Galapagos4.

Track listing
"Intro (Cry No More)" - 0:25
"The Crown" - 3:25
"My Watch" - 2:56
"Changing Room" - 0:22 
"Puzzling Thing" - 3:42
"Better Luck" - 2:21
"Drop It Like It's Hotline" - 2:13
"Denizen Walks Away" - 3:15
"The Bitter Cold" - 2:16
"It's the Bomb" - 0:16
"On My Square" - 4:50
"Blank Stone" - 2:53
"Scientists of Sound" - 0:15
"Mathematics" - 3:57
"Gil Say They Don't Knock" - 1:49
"Bowl of Tea" - 0:24
"Reflections from the Porch" - 2:29
"The Gordeon Knock" - 3:28
"TC Back for More" - 1:02
"Full Clip (For the Last Day)" - 3:36

References

2012 albums